There are eleven types of elections in Taiwan which, since 2012, have been unified into general and local elections, each held every four years, typically in January and November respectively. There may also be by-elections. Electoral systems include first-past-the-post, proportional representation, single non-transferable voting, and a parallel mixture of the above.

General elections are held to elect the president and vice president jointly, and the 113 members of the Legislative Yuan. Local elections are held to elect magistrates of counties, mayors of special municipalities, cities, townships and county-administered cities, chief administrators of indigenous districts and village chiefs. Legislative Yuan and local elections are regional; citizens vote based on their registered address.

Elections are supervised by the Central Election Commission (CEC), an independent agency under the central government, with the municipality, county and city election commissions under its jurisdiction. The minimum voting age is twenty years. Voters must satisfy a four-month residency requirement before being allowed to cast a ballot.

History
Elections were held for the first time in Taiwan by the Japanese colonial government on 22 November 1935, electing half of the city and township councillors. The other half were appointed by the prefectural governors. Only men aged 25 and above and who had paid a tax of five yen or more a year were allowed to vote, which was only 28,000 out of the 4 million population. The elections were held again in 1939, but the 1943 election was cancelled due to the Second World War. After the surrender of Japan and the transfer of Taiwanese control to the Republic of China, elections were held at the local level as well as to elect representatives to the National Assembly and the Legislative Yuan.

The government of the Republic of China, led by the Kuomintang, retreated to Taiwan Island in 1949 after losing the Chinese Civil War with the Chinese Communist Party. At that time, the Temporary Provisions Effective During the Period of Communist Rebellion was enforced and largely restricted civil and political rights including voting rights of the Taiwanese people. In the eight elections starting from the 1948 Republic of China presidential election in Nanking (later known as Nanjing) to the 1990 Taiwan presidential election, the President was indirectly elected by the National Assembly first elected in 1947 and which had never been reelected in its entirety since. Similarly, the Legislative Yuan also had not been reelected as a whole since 1948. The provincial Governor and municipal Mayors were appointed by the central government. Direct elections were only held for local governments at the county level, and for legislators at the provincial level. In addition, the Martial law in Taiwan also prohibited most forms of opposition. 

From the 1990s, a series of democratic reforms were implemented in Taiwan. The Additional Articles of the Constitution were adopted to grant full civil and political rights to the Taiwanese people (officially the people of the Free area of the Republic of China). Under the Additional Articles, the President are to be elected by popular vote and all seats in the national parliament are to be reelected. Following the reforms, the first parliamentary elections on Taiwan were held in 1991 for the National Assembly and 1992 for the Legislative Yuan. The first election for provincial Governors and municipality Mayors was held in 1994. Most importantly, Taiwan held the first direct election of the President and Vice President in 1996.

The provincial government was reconstructed as a subsidiary of the central government in 1998 and elections for governor and provincial legislators were terminated. The National Assembly ceased to be convened regularly in 2000 and was abolished in 2005. The number of members of the Legislative Yuan was reduced to 113 from 2008.

In recent years, the government has further consolidated the various elections into two categories: national elections and local elections, each election category to be held on the same day.
 The national elections elect the President and Vice President as well as the 113 Legislators.
 The local elections elect 11,130 local officials who serve in self-government bodies.

Current election types

Presidential elections

Presidential elections are held to jointly elect the president and vice president by first-past-the-post.

Legislative Yuan elections

Legislative elections are held to elect the 113 members of the Legislative Yuan by parallel voting:
 73 members by first-past-the-post in single-member constituencies
 6 by single non-transferable voting in multi-member constituencies, exclusive for persons with indigenous status
 34 by party-list proportional representation voting

Local elections

Nine types of local elections are held to elect:
 Mayors of special municipalities
 Magistrates of counties and mayors of cities
 Councillors in special municipality councils
 Councillors in county and city councils
 Mayors of townships and county-administered cities
 Representatives in township/city councils
 Chief administrators of mountain indigenous districts
 Representatives in mountain indigenous district councils
 Village chiefs
The local elections are also known as "nine-in-one elections" as the election date has been consolidated in recent years. A resident of a county or indigenous district is eligible for five types of votes, whereas a resident of a city or non-indigenous district of a special municipality is eligible for three. Magistrates, mayors, chief administrators, and village chiefs are elected by first-past-the-post. Councillors and council representatives are elected by single non-transferable voting in multi-member constituencies.

Eligibility
In order to vote in Taiwan, one must be a national with household registration of the Republic of China who will be 20 years or older on the day before the election.

For presidential elections, the voter must have once lived in the Taiwan area for six consecutive months or longer. Residents of the area at the time of the election are automatically registered while those living abroad must apply.

For legislative and local elections, the voter must have been living in the associated electoral district for four consecutive months or longer at the time of the election. For legislative elections, the electoral district for indigenous and party-list votes is nationwide. Eligibility for the three types of votes is evaluated separately.

Upcoming elections and referendums 
For past elections, see respective articles.
 2023 referendum (if a proposal is approved)
 2024 presidential and legislative

See also
 Central Election Commission (Taiwan)
 List of political parties in Taiwan
 Administrative divisions of Taiwan
 Politics of Taiwan
 History of Taiwan
 History of the Republic of China
 Electoral calendar
 Electoral system
 Voting rights of Taiwanese expatriates

References

External links 

Adam Carr's Election Archive
Central Election Commission
Constitution of the Republic of China (Taiwan)
Additional Articles of Constitution of the Republic of China (Taiwan)